Sympistis sokar is a moth of the family Noctuidae first described by James T. Troubridge in 2008. It is found in the US state of Oregon.

References

sokar
Moths described in 2008